Brazey may refer to two communes in the Côte-d'Or department in eastern France:
 Brazey-en-Morvan
 Brazey-en-Plaine